Abrar Hussain may refer to:
 Abrar Hussain (general) (1918–1992), Pakistani war hero
 Abrar Hussain (boxer) (1965–2011), Pakistani boxer